The 2019 King's Cup is an international football tournament that is currently being held in Thailand from 5 to 8 June 2019. The 4 national teams involved in the tournament are required to register a squad of 23 players.

Players marked (c) were named as captain for their national squad. Number of caps counts until the start of the tournament, including all FIFA-recognised pre-tournament friendlies. Player's age is their age on the opening day of the tournament.

Coach:  Remko Bicentini

The final squad was announced on 2 June 2019.
Caps and goals are as of 12 October 2018 after the match against US Virgin Islands.

Coach:  Igor Štimac

The final squad was announced on 2 June 2019.
Caps and goals are as of 14 January 2019 after the match against Bahrain.

Coach:  Sirisak Yodyardthai (caretaker)

The final squad was announced on 4 June 2019.
Caps and goals are as of 25 March 2019 after the match against Uruguay.

Coach:  Park Hang-seo

The final squad was announced on 31 May 2019.
Caps and goals are as of 25 January 2019 after the match against Japan.

References 

King's Cup